John Whitty may refer to:
 John Whitty (priest)
 John Whitty (cricketer)
 John Whitty (snooker player)